Rudilnitsy is a rural locality (a village) in Gorod Vyazniki, Vyaznikovsky District, Vladimir Oblast, Russia. The population was 51 as of 2010.

Geography 
Rudilnitsy is located on the Klyazma River, 16 km east of Vyazniki (the district's administrative centre) by road. Bragino is the nearest rural locality.

References 

Rural localities in Vyaznikovsky District